Listowel Castle, located near the town of Listowel, County Kerry in Ireland, was built in the 15th century. It was the last bastion against Queen Elizabeth I in the First Desmond Rebellion, and was the last fortress of the Geraldines to be subdued. It fell after 28 days siege to Sir Charles Wilmot on 5 November 1568, who had the castle's garrison executed in the following days. The castle is a noted example of Anglo-Norman architecture in County Kerry, and has been the subject of several restoration projects. It is now protected as a national monument, and is open to the public for tours on a daily basis.

History and restoration
The castle became the property of the Hare family, the holders of the title of Earl of Listowel, after reverting away from the Fitzmaurices, Knights of Kerry. 

The remaining remnants of the castle include two of its original four towers, which are joined by a heavy curtain wall, and the unusual feature of an arch below the battlements.  Archaeological excavations and records of the castle reveal that it was originally of similar form to Bunratty Castle, County Clare.

In 2005, restoration works were commenced by the Office of Public Works. The stonework has been cleaned by a team of craftsmen, while the upper section, which had become particularly distressed with the passing of time, was restored and rendered waterproof. An external staircase, in keeping with the architecture of the structure, was erected to enable the public to access the upper stories.

Another Anglo-Norman castle at Woodford, Listowel, was built in the post-1600 period by the Knight of Kerry.

The Seanchaí Literary Centre, which is adjacently located in a Georgian town house, includes displays on the castle's history.

Sources 
 Heritage Ireland: Listowel Castle

Castles in County Kerry
Listowel
National Monuments in County Kerry
Ruins in the Republic of Ireland